"Shame Shame Shame" is a single by American heavy metal band Ratt, released on their album Detonator. The song's lyrics focus mainly on cheating. The song was co-written by famed songwriter Desmond Child, Ratt guitarist Warren DeMartini and lead singer Stephen Pearcy. The song features a slow detuned opening guitar solo, titled "Intro To Shame", that suddenly speeds up at the 0:55 mark until the drums and the bass come in at 1:01 into the song.

Track listing
1. Shame Shame Shame 
2. Top Secret
 
Notes :
-The Promo CD included one track with "Intro To Shame" & "Shame Shame Shame" as one track,
    and a separate track with just "Shame Shame Shame".
-There was a 3" CD single released in Japan.

Music video
In the music video for the song, the bandmembers are in an airship. The airship is apparently being attacked by another airship piloted and manned by a crew of strippers. The band retaliates and is successfully defeating the other airship until one of the women activates a switch called "Detonator" (also the title of the album). After doing so, the band's airship blows up and the bandmembers and strippers fall safely from the sky unharmed. The cliffhanger ending is not resolved until the video for their next single, "Lovin' You's a Dirty Job".

Personnel
Stephen Pearcy - vocals
Warren DeMartini - co-lead guitar
Robbin Crosby - guitar
Juan Croucier - bass guitar
Bobby Blotzer - drums
Michael Schenker - guest lead guitar (was not credited until the 2007's "Tell The World: The Very Best Of Ratt" compilation)

Ratt songs
1990 songs
1990 singles
Songs written by Desmond Child
Songs written by Stephen Pearcy
Songs written by Warren DeMartini
Atlantic Records singles